Hutapanjang is a stratovolcano on Sumatra, Indonesia. Little is known about this volcano.

See also 

 List of volcanoes in Indonesia

References 

Hutapanjang
Hutapanjang
Hutapanjang